Jeong Suk-young (born 12 April 1993) is a South Korean tennis player.

Jeong has a career high ATP singles ranking of 270 achieved on 9 September 2013. He also has a career high ATP doubles ranking of 466 achieved on 16 September 2013.

Jeong made his ATP main draw debut at the 2013 PTT Thailand Open in the singles draw facing Denis Istomin. Jeong also represents South Korea at the Davis Cup, where he has a W/L record of 4–5.

ATP Challenger and ITF Futures finals

Singles: 6 (1–5)

Doubles: 4 (0–4)

External links

1993 births
Living people
South Korean male tennis players
Sportspeople from Busan
Tennis players at the 2010 Asian Games
Asian Games competitors for South Korea
21st-century South Korean people